The 1998–99 Israel State Cup (Gvia HaMedina) was the 60th season of Israel's nationwide football cup competition and the 45th after the Israeli Declaration of Independence.

The competition was won by Hapoel Tel Aviv who had beaten Beitar Jerusalem 3–1 on penalties after 1–1 in the final.

By winning, Hapoel Tel Aviv qualified to the 1999–2000 UEFA Cup, entering in the qualifying round.

Results

Sixth Round

Seventh Round

Eighth Round

Round of 16

Quarter-finals

Semi-finals

Final

References
100 Years of Football 1906-2006, Elisha Shohat (Israel), 2006, p. 307
Israel Cups 1998/99 RSSSF

Israel State Cup
State Cup
Israel State Cup seasons